The bat-eared fox (Otocyon megalotis) is a species of fox found on the African savanna. It is the only extant species of the genus Otocyon and considered a basal canid species. Fossil records indicate this canid first appeared during the middle Pleistocene.

It is named for its large ears, which have a role in thermoregulation. The bat referred to in its colloquial name is possibly the Egyptian slit-faced bat (Nycteris thebaica), which is abundant in the region and has very large ears. Although not commonly used, other vernacular names include big-eared fox, black-eared fox, long-eared fox, Delalande's fox, cape fox, and motlosi.

Systematics and evolution
The bat-eared fox is the only living species of the genus Otocyon. Its scientific name, given by Anselme Gaëtan Desmarest, was initially Canis megalotis (due to its close resemblance to jackals), and later changed by Salomon Müller which placed it in its own genus, Otocyon; its huge ears and different dental formula warrant inclusion in a genus distinct from both Canis and true foxes (Vulpes). The generic name Otocyon is derived from the Greek words otus for ear and cyon for dog, while the specific name megalotis comes from the Greek words mega for large and otus for ear.

Due to its different dentition, the bat-eared fox was previously placed in a distinct subfamily of canids, Otocyoninae, as no relationship to any living species of canid could be established. However, according to more recent examinations, this species is regarded as having affinities with the vulpine line, and Otocyon was placed with high confidence as sister to the clade containing both the raccoon dog (Nyctereutes) and true foxes (Vulpes), occupying a basal position within Canidae.

Subspecies
Currently, there are two recognized subspecies:
 Otocyon megalotis megalotis (Desmarest, 1822) — found in southern Africa
 Otocyon megalotis virgatus (Cabrera, 1910) — found in eastern Africa

Fossils
Otocyon is poorly represented in the fossil record. It is suggested the genus forms a clade with Prototocyon, an extinct genus of canid. However, the generic distinction between Prototocyon and the extant Otocyon is doubtful. Fossils of an extinct fox-like canine known as Otocyon recki, have been found in sediments of the Olduvai Gorge, Tanzania, dating back to the late Pliocene or early Pleistocene. However, it is now often placed in Prototocyon.

Description 
Bat-eared foxes are relatively small canids, ranging in weight from 3 kg to 5.3 kg. Head and body length is 46–66 cm, tail length is 23–34 cm, shoulder height is 30–40 cm, and the notably large ears are 11–13 cm long.

Generally, the pelage is tan-colored, with gray agouti guard hairs, giving its grizzled appearance, appearing more buff on the sides. The undersides and throat are pale. The limbs are dark, shading to dark brown or black at their extremities. The muzzle, the tip and upperside of the tail and the facial mask are black. The insides of the ears are white. Individuals of the East African subspecies, O. m. virgatus, tend toward a buff pelage with dark brown markings, as opposed to the black of O. m. megalotis. Proportionally large ears of bat-eared foxes, a characteristic shared by many other inhabitants of hot, arid climates, help to distribute heat. They also help in locating prey.

Range and distribution 
The bat-eared fox has a disjointed range of distribution across the arid and semi-arid regions of Eastern and Southern Africa, in two allopatric populations (representing each of the recognized subspecies) separated by approximately 1,000 km. Subspecies O. m. virgatus extends from southern Sudan, Ethiopia and Somalia, through Uganda and Kenya to southwestern Tanzania; O. m. megalotis occurs in the southern part of Africa, ranging from Angola through Namibia and Botswana to South Africa, and extends as far east as Mozambique and Zimbabwe, spreading into the Cape Peninsula and toward Cape Agulhas. Home ranges vary in size from 0.3 to 3.5 km2. There are no confirmed observations in Zambia.

Habitat 
Bat-eared foxes are adapted to arid or semi-arid environments. They are commonly found in short grasslands, as well as the more arid regions of the savannas, along woodland edges, and in open acacia woodlands. They prefer bare ground and areas where grass is kept short by grazing ungulates and tend to hunt in these short grass and low shrub habitats. However, they do venture into areas with tall grasses and thick shrubs to hide when threatened.

In addition to raising their young in dens, bat-eared foxes use self-dug dens for shelter from extreme temperatures and winds. They also lie under acacia trees in South Africa to seek shade during the day.

Diet

Bat-eared foxes are considered the only truly insectivorous canid, with a marked preference for harvester termites (Hodotermes mossambicus), which can constitute 80–90% of its diet.

When this particular species of termite is not available, their opportunistic diet allows a wide variety of food items to be taken: they can consume other species of termites, other arthropods such as ants, beetles (especially scarab beetles), crickets, grasshoppers, millipedes, moths, scorpions, spiders, and rarely birds, birds' eggs and chicks, small mammals, reptiles, and fungi (the desert truffle Kalaharituber pfeilii). Berries, seeds, and wild fruit also are consumed. The bat-eared fox refuses to feed on snouted harvester termites, likely because it is not adapted to tolerate termites' chemical defense.

Generally, bat-eared foxes meet their water requirements by the high water content of their diet. Water constitutes a critical resource during lactation.

Dentition
The teeth of the bat-eared fox are much smaller and reduced in shearing surface formation than teeth of other canid species. This is an adaptation to its insectivorous diet. The bat-eared fox is an old species that was widely distributed in the Pleistocene era. The teeth are not the bat-eared fox's only morphological adaptation for its diet. On the lower jaw, a step-like protrusion, called the subangular process, anchors the large digastric muscle to allow for rapid chewing. The digastric muscle is also modified to open and close the jaw five times per second.

Foraging
Bat-eared foxes usually hunt in groups, often splitting up in pairs, with separated subgroups moving through the same general area. When termites are plentiful, feeding aggregations of up to 15 individuals from different families occur. Individuals forage alone after family groups break in June or July and during the months after cub birth.

Prey is located primarily by auditory means, rather than by smell or sight. Foraging patterns vary between seasons and populations, and coincide with termite availability. In eastern Africa, nocturnal foraging is the rule, while in southern Africa, nocturnal foraging during summer slowly changes to an almost solely diurnal pattern during the winter. Foraging techniques depend on prey type, but food is often located by walking slowly, nose close to the ground and ears tilted forward. It usually occurs in patches, which match the clumped prey resources, such as termite colonies, that also occur in patches. Groups are able to forage on clumps of prey in patches because they do not fight each other for food due to their degree of sociality and lack of territoriality.

Behavior
In the more northern areas of its range (around Serengeti), they are nocturnal 85% of the time. However, around South Africa, they are nocturnal only in the summer and diurnal during the winter.

Bat-eared foxes are highly social animals. They often live in pairs or groups, and home ranges of groups either overlap substantially or very little. In southern Africa, bat-eared foxes live in monogamous pairs with kits, while those in eastern Africa may live in pairs, or in stable family groups consisting of a male and up to three closely related females with cubs. Individuals forage, play, and rest together in a group, which helps in protection against predators. They engage in frequent and extended allogrooming sessions, which serve to strengthen group cohesion, mostly between mature adults, but also between young adults and mature adults

Visual displays are very important in communication among bat-eared foxes. When they are looking intently at something, the head is held high, eyes are open, ears are erect and facing forward, and the mouth is closed. When an individual is in threat or showing submission, the ears are pulled back and lying against the head and the head is low. The tail also plays a role in communication. When an individual is asserting dominance or aggression, feeling threatened, playing, or being sexually aroused, the tail is arched in an inverted U shape. Individuals can also use piloerection, which occurs when individual hairs are standing straight, to make it appear larger when faced with extreme threat. When running, chasing, or fleeing, the tail is straight and horizontal. The bat-eared fox can recognize individuals up to 30 m away. The recognition process has three steps: First they ignore the individual, then they stare intently, and finally they either approach or attack without displays. When greeting another, the approaching individual shows symbolic submission which is received by the other individual with a high head and tail down. Few vocalizations are used for communication, but contact calls and warning calls are used, mostly during the winter. Glandular secretions and scratching, other than for digging, are absent in communication.

Reproduction
The bat-eared fox is predominantly socially monogamous, although it has been observed in polygynous groups. In contrast to other canids, the bat-eared fox has a reversal in parental roles, with the male taking on the majority of the parental care behavior. Gestation lasts for 60–70 days and females give birth to litters consisting of one to six kits. Beyond lactation, which lasts 14 to 15 weeks, males take over grooming, defending, huddling, chaperoning, and carrying the young between den sites. Additionally, male care and den attendance rates have been shown to have a direct correlation with cub survival rates. The female forages for food, which she uses to maintain milk production, on which the pups heavily depend. Food foraged by the female is not brought back to the pups or regurgitated to feed the pups.

Pups in the Kalahari region are born September–November and those in the Botswana region are born October–December. Young bat-eared foxes disperse and leave their family groups at 5–6 months old and reach sexual maturity at 8–9 months. Bat-eared foxes have been recorded reaching maximum lifespans of over 14 to 17 years in captivity.

Conservation threats

The bat-eared fox has some commercial use for humans. They are important for harvester termite population control, as the termites are considered pests. They have also been hunted for their fur by Botswana natives. Additional threats to populations include disease and drought that can harm populations of prey; however, no major threats to bat-eared fox populations exist.

Notes

References

bat-eared fox
Carnivorans of Africa
Fauna of East Africa
Mammals of Southern Africa
Mammals of Angola
Mammals of Botswana
Mammals of Ethiopia
Mammals of Kenya
Mammals of Namibia
Mammals of South Africa
Mammals of Tanzania
Mammals of Zambia
Myrmecophagous mammals
bat-eared fox